Luticola permuticopsis is a species of non-marine diatom first found in lakes of James Ross Island.

References

Further reading
Kopalová, Kateřina. "The freshwater diatom flora from Ulu Peninsula (James Ross Island, NW Weddel Sea, Antarctica)." Diatomededelingen 36: 33.
Kopalová, Kateřina, et al. "Non-marine diatoms (Bacillariophyta) from Ulu Peninsula (James Ross Island, NW Weddell Sea, Antarctica)."

External links
AlgaeBase

Naviculales